A soundtrack album is any album that incorporates music directly recorded from the soundtrack of a particular feature film or television show. The first such album to be commercially released was Walt Disney's Snow White and the Seven Dwarfs, the soundtrack to the film of the same name, in 1938. The first soundtrack album of a film's orchestral score was that for Alexander Korda's 1942 film Rudyard Kipling's Jungle Book, composed by Miklós Rózsa.

Overview
When a feature film is released, or during and after a television series airs, an album in the form of a soundtrack is frequently released alongside it. 

A soundtrack typically contains instrumentation or alternatively a film score. But it can also feature songs that were sung or performed by characters in a scene (or a cover version of a song in the media, rerecorded by a popular artist), songs that were used as intentional or unintentional background music in important scenes, songs that were heard in the closing credits, or songs for no apparent reason related to the media other than for promotion, that were included in a soundtrack.

Soundtracks are usually released on major record labels (just as if they were released by a musical artist), and the songs and the soundtrack itself can also be on music charts, and win musical awards.

By convention, a soundtrack record can contain any kind of music including music "inspired by" but not actually appearing in the movie; the score contains only music by the original film's composers.

Contemporaneously, a soundtrack can go against normality, (most typically used in popular culture franchises) and contains recently released or exclusive never before released original pop music selections, (some of which become high-charting records on their own, which due to being released on another franchises title, peaked because of that) and is simply used for promotional purposes for well known artists, or new or unknown artists. These soundtracks contain music not at all heard in the film/television series, and any artistic or lyrical connection is purely coincidental.

However depending on the genre of the media the soundtrack of popular songs would have a set pattern; a lighthearted romance might feature easy listening love songs, whilst a more dark thriller would compose of hard rock or urban music.

In 1908, Camille Saint-Saëns composed the first music specifically for use in a motion picture (L'assasinat du duc de Guise), and releasing recordings of songs used in films became prevalent in the 1930s. Henry Mancini, who won an Emmy Award and two Grammys for his soundtrack to Peter Gunn, was the first composer to have a widespread hit with a song from a soundtrack.

Before the 1970s, soundtracks (with a few exceptions), accompanied towards musicals, and was an album that featured vocal and instrumental, (and instrumental versions of vocal songs) musical selections performed by cast members. Or cover versions of songs sung by another artist.

After the 1970s, soundtracks started to include more diversity, and music consumers would anticipate a motion picture or television soundtrack. Majority of top charting songs were those featured or released on a film or television soundtrack album.

Nowadays, the term "soundtrack" sort of subsided. It now mostly commonly refers to instrumental background music used in that media. Popular songs featured in a film or television series are instead highlighted and referenced in the credits, not a part of a "soundtrack".

In advertisements or store listings, soundtrack albums are sometimes confused with original cast albums. These are albums made with the original stage cast of a musical, and are recorded by the cast either in live performance or in a studio, not transferred from a movie soundtrack.

In some cases, recorded dialogue may be incorporated into the soundtrack album. This comes in two kinds: audio clips from the movie itself (used on the albums for Pulp Fiction and Apollo 13, for example) or radio dramas that involve the characters from the movie involved in other events (example: King of Pirates, from FLCL). The unusual first soundtrack album of the 1939 film The Wizard of Oz, issued in 1956 in conjunction with the film's first telecast, was virtually a condensed version of the film, with enough dialogue on the album for the listener to be able to easily follow the plot, as was the first soundtrack album of the 1968 Romeo and Juliet, and the soundtrack albums of The Taming of the Shrew (1967 version), Cromwell, and Little Big Man. In the case of Patton, the bulk of the album featured the film's musical score, while the opening and final tracks featured George C. Scott's opening and closing speeches from the movie. The highly unusual soundtrack album of the 1972 mystery film Sleuth was designed as a sort of teaser, with Laurence Olivier and Michael Caine's voices heard for the first three minutes, after which the dialogue was abruptly cut off and the musical score of the film took over, forcing listeners to "see the film if they wished to know what the mystery was all about."

In a few rare instances, the complete soundtrack for a film — dialogue, music, sound effects, etc. — has been released.  One notable example was a 3-LP set of the 1977 Rankin-Bass film The Hobbit.  Because this particular film was produced for television, it lent itself well to the LP format: built-in commercial insert points were used to end each LP side, thus avoiding any additional editing. Another example was the above-mentioned Zeffirelli Romeo and Juliet – the movie proved so popular that two years after the film's original release, an album set of the complete soundtrack was released. Still another example was the Laurence Olivier Richard III, the soundtrack of which was released as a 3-LP album by RCA Victor in 1955.

Extra tracks
Sometimes tracks not in the movie are included in the album, especially on a CD release of the soundtrack as opposed to an LP. Some of these may be "outtakes" (songs or instrumental music recorded for use in the movie but "cut" in the final edit as released), or they may have been used in trailers but not in the movie itself.  Examples include the South Park: Bigger, Longer & Uncut soundtrack. Two other well-known examples are the soundtrack albums to Rodgers and Hammerstein's Carousel and The King and I both of which include two or more songs not heard in the finished film.

Popularity in cultures

Soundtrack albums account for the bulk of the Indian music industry. Music from the Indian film industry, particularly the music of Bollywood, usually sells more than Indian pop records.

Lists

Best-selling soundtrack albums

Best-streaming soundtrack albums

See also
Soundtrack
Cast recording – for musical theater
Show tune
Film score

References

Album types